The House of Korecki (Polish: ród Koreckich (Korecki clan), Koreccy) was a princely family of the Grand Duchy of Lithuania origin. The name is derived from the original seat of the family at the  Korets Castle, which was part of the Grand Duchy of Lithuania at these times (today Rivne Oblast). 

There are two family legends about the descent. By one of them it descended from Patrikas, son of Narymunt, the second eldest son of Gediminas. By another legend, it derives from Kaributas, son of Algirdas, Grand Duke of Lithuania.

The princely family line became extinct in the 17th century.

Coat of arms
The family used the Pogonia Coat of Arms, granted to Lithuanian noblemen upon the union into the Polish–Lithuanian Commonwealth.

Notable members
 Samuel Korecki (1586–1622), a nobleman of the Polish–Lithuanian Commonwealth 
 
 
  (1621–1651)
  (2001) (Russian Empire)

See also
Korecki

References

External links
 https://web.archive.org/web/20130921210104/http://mariusz.eu.pn/genealogia/rody/koreccy01.html